The Mahlberg is a mountain in the northwest of the Northern Black Forest and, at , is the highest point in the Baden-Württemberg county of Karlsruhe and the parish of  Völkersbach. Its eastern side belongs to the municipality of Malsch in Karlsruhe and the western side to the borough of Gaggenau in the county of Rastatt.

Geography

Location 
The Mahlberg lies within the Central/North Black Forest Nature Park. It rises between the Gaggenau villages of Freiolsheim in the northwest, Moosbronn in the east and  Michelbach in the southwest. Its western side belongs to the Gaggenau parish of Rotenfels; on the eastern side lies an exclave of the Malsch parish of Völkersbach.

Rivers and streams 
The Moosalb flows past the Mahlberg to the east and the Michelbach runs past it to the south, the little tributaries of which -  Obersbach, Walkenbach, Litzelbach and Eckbach - rise south and southwest of the mountain. In the west the waters of the Hildebrand spring flow into the Waldprechtsbach.

Reserves 
On the eastern slopes of the Mahlberg lie parts of the nature reserve of Alb Valley and Side Valleys (Albtal und Seitentäler, CDDA No. 162059; established in 1994; 6.36 km² in area) and the Special Area of Conservation of the same name (No. 7116-341; 27.2533 km²). The eastern side also includes parts of the protected landscape  (LSG) of the Alb Valley Plateaux and Herrenalb Mountains (Albtalplatten und Herrenalber Berge, CDDA No. 319471; 1994; 47.1223 km²), and up to the western flank extends another LSG, the Eichelberg and Mahlberg (Um den Eichelberg und Mahlberg, CDDA No. 319471; 1994; 47.1223 km²).

Summit region 
On the summit of the Mahlberg stands the Mahlberg Tower. Next to it is a refuge hut with a public barbecue area. Not far from the tower there is a memorial site with the grave of two Wehrmacht soldiers who died on 10 April 1945 when the radio station on the mountain was shelled during the Second World War.

Mahlberg Tower 

The tower on the top of the Mahlberg was built as a reinforced concrete observation tower. On the tower is a plaque with an inscription that is translated as follows:

The tower, which is open to the public, is a popular destination with hikers. In the area of its entrance there is a request for small donations to assist in preserving the tower. The viewing platform is reached via 160 steps and has views of the Murg and Moosalb valleys, large parts of the Upper Rhine Plain, the Vosges and the Palatine Forest, and the Kraichgau and Odenwald.

References

External links 

Mountains under 1000 metres
Mountains and hills of Baden-Württemberg
Mountains and hills of the Black Forest
Rastatt (district)
Karlsruhe (district)